Unedogemmula deshayesii is a species of sea snail, a marine gastropod mollusk in the family Turridae, the turrids.

Description
The length of the shell attains 66.9 mm.

Distribution
This marine species occurs in the East China Sea, South China Sea; off Japan, Vietnam and the Philippines.

References

 Doumet, E. (1840) Nouvelle espèce de Pleurotoma. Revue Zoologique, par la Société Cuvierienne; Association universelle pour l'avancement de la zoologie, de l'anatomie comparée et de la palæontologie; Journal mensuel, 2, 324–325.

External links
 Li, Baoquan, and Xinzheng Li. "Report on the turrid genera Gemmula, Lophiotoma and Ptychosyrinx (Gastropoda: Turridae: Turrinae) from the China seas." Zootaxa 1778.1 (2008): 1-25.

deshayesii
Gastropods described in 1840